Joseph Mills (2 December 1895 – 1979) was an English footballer who played in the Football League for Luton Town and Nottingham Forest.

References

1895 births
1938 deaths
English footballers
Association football midfielders
English Football League players
Nottingham Forest F.C. players
Luton Town F.C. players
Bentley Colliery F.C. players
Thorne Colliery F.C. players